The School District of West Allis-West Milwaukee is a school district mostly in Milwaukee County, Wisconsin.  The district has two comprehensive high schools (grades 9-12), one alternative high school (grades 9-12), one charter high school (grades 9-12), three intermediate schools (grades 6-8) and eleven elementary schools (grades 4K-5). The superintendent is Dr. Martin Lexmond. The West Allis-West Milwaukee Board of Education is composed of nine members.

The district is mostly in Milwaukee County, where it includes the City of West Allis, the Village of West Milwaukee, and a small portion of Greenfield. It includes a small portion of New Berlin, Waukesha County.

Board of Education 
The school board has nine members who serve three year terms. The school board has regular school board meetings, usually on the second and fourth Monday of the month, at the district's Administration Building.

Schools

High schools
West Allis Central High School
Nathan Hale High School
James E. Dottke High School
Shared Journeys Charter School

Intermediate schools
Frank Lloyd Wright Intermediate School
Lane Intermediate School
West Milwaukee Intermediate School

Elementary schools
Franklin Elementary School
Hoover Elementary School
Irving Elementary School
Jefferson Elementary School
Longfellow Elementary School
Madison Elementary School
Horace Mann Elementary School
General Mitchell Elementary School
Pershing Elementary School
Walker Elementary School
Wilson Elementary School

4K Centers
In the  2016-17 school year, all satellite 4K centers were eliminated and the programs were placed within their corresponding neighborhood school.

References

External links
West Allis-West Milwaukee School District Website

School districts in Wisconsin
Education in Milwaukee County, Wisconsin
West Allis, Wisconsin